Bed of Roses is an Australian television comedy drama series which premiered on the Australian Broadcasting Corporation (ABC) on 10 May 2008. It lasted three seasons, consisting of 26 episodes in total, concluding on 26 February 2011. The series broadcast on Saturday nights at 7:30 pm throughout its run.

The following is a list of episodes

Series overview

Season 1 (2008)

Season 2 (2010)

Season 3 (2010–2011)

Ratings

References 

Lists of Australian drama television series episodes